Seltso is a rural locality (a village) in Klyazminskoye Rural Settlement, Kovrovsky District, Vladimir Oblast, Russia. The population was 21 as of 2010.

Geography 
Seltso is located 43 km east of Kovrov (the district's administrative centre) by road. Panteleyevo is the nearest rural locality.

References 

Rural localities in Kovrovsky District